The Italy national under-18 rugby union team is the under-18 team of the Italy national rugby union team in the sport of rugby union.

History
Under-18 became a recognised age-grade in European rugby in 2004.

European Championship
Italy, who is the only other six nation side apart from France to have competed at every edition of the European Under-18 Rugby Union Championship, has done so with moderate success. A third place in 2006 stands as the team's best result, while a last place finish in the A division in 2009 almost meant relegation.

In a revamped competition in 2011, the elite division featured only the top four teams and Scotland and Italy failed to qualify. The two sides reached the final of the first division where Italy lost 12–17 to Scotland. The elite division was expanded to 8 teams for 2012, to include all of the six nations sides.

Honours
 European Under-18 Rugby Union Championship:
 A Division Runners-up: 2011

European championship

Positions
The team's final positions in the European championship:

External links
   Official site of the Italian Rugby Federation

Under 18
European national under-18 rugby union teams